The Battle of Bornhöved or Bornhöft was a battle on 7 December 1813 between a Swedish cavalry regiment under Bror Cederström and Prince Frederik of Hesse's Danish troops reinforced by smaller numbers of Polish cavalry and German infantry. The clash occurred at the small village of Bornhöft in what is now Schleswig-Holstein in north Germany. The engagement occurred during the War of the Sixth Coalition, part of the Napoleonic Wars, and was the last time Swedish and Danish forces met on the battlefield.

Background 
Crown prince Charles John led a division of the northern armies, including the Mörner's Hussar Regiment (later the Crown Prince's Hussar Regiment), under the command of the commander of the Swedish cavalry Anders Fredrik Skjöldebrand, to pursue the retreating Danish army. The idea was for the Swedish cavalry to advance in parallel to the Danes until general Wallmoden could cut off their retreat and force the outmanoeuvred Danes to surrender.

Battle 
Charles John had been very economical with Swedish forces throughout the war and deliberately held back to allow the allies to take huge losses whilst he held onto the Swedish forces for future use. The Swedish cavalry thus felt left out of all the war's previous major battles. This, in addition to their regiment not seeing combat in the 1808–09 war that lost Finland, made them disobey their orders and ride straight against the Danish forces. It then clashed with the Danish rearguard (made up of Polish ulans, an elite force sent out by Napoleon to cover the Danish retreat) throughout the day until in the evening the Swedes met the main Danish force gathered at Bornhöved. This 2,500 strong Danish force was made up of infantry, cavalry and artillery and would not normally have considered the advance guard of the Swedish cavalry as a major threat (since in such difficult terrain and so close to nightfall a frontal cavalry assault on the massed infantry with artillery support would be pure folly), but since their rearguard was still embroiled in fighting with Swedish patrols the Danes formed up in ranks and waited.

First came the Danish rearguard, still harried by some Swedish squadrons under major Fritz von der Lancken and finally dispersed by the Swedish assault. The attackers then turned on the main Danish force and the Danes staked all their forces at once, with a Swedish reconnaissance beaten off and von der Lancken in retreat. In the meantime the main Swedish force began to form up. With seven squadrons totalling 471 men, commanded by Colonel Bror Cederström, the Swedish cavalry immediately moved to the attack, broke up the Danish formations and drove them into retreat. The Swedish victory at Bornhöved came to be an important step towards Sweden's goal of taking Norway from Denmark, ultimately achieved in the Treaty of Kiel.

Sources

External links

Battles of the War of the Sixth Coalition
Battles of the Napoleonic Wars
Bornhöved (1813)
Bornhöved (1813)
Conflicts in 1813
December 1813 events
1813 in Denmark
1813 in Germany
Battles in Schleswig-Holstein
Bornhoved